The following highways are numbered 52A:

United States
 County Road 52A (Pasco County, Florida)
Missouri Route 52A (former)
 New York State Route 52A

See also
List of highways numbered 52